124 Squadron may refer to:

 No. 124 Squadron RCAF, see list of Royal Canadian Air Force squadrons
 124 Squadron (Israel)
 124 Squadron, Republic of Singapore Air Force, see list of Republic of Singapore Air Force squadrons
 No. 124 Squadron RAF, United Kingdom
 124th Aero Squadron, Air Service, United States Army
 124th Attack Squadron, United States Air Force
 VAW-124, United States Navy
 VF-124, United States Navy
 VF-124 (1950-8), United States Navy
 VMFA-124, United States Marine Corps

See also
 Escadrille 124 (disambiguation)